Lixisols are a Reference Soil Group of the World Reference Base for Soil Resources (WRB). They are soils with subsurface accumulation of low activity clays and high base saturation. They develop under intensive tropical weathering conditions and subhumid to semi-arid climate.

See also
 Soil type

References

Further reading
 W. Zech, P. Schad, G. Hintermaier-Erhard: Soils of the World. Springer, Berlin 2022, Chapter 9.3.1.

External links 
 profile photos (with classification) WRB homepage
 profile photos (with classification) IUSS World of Soils

Pedology
Types of soil